An intern is one who works in a temporary position with an emphasis on on-the-job training rather than merely employment.

Intern or internship may also refer to:

 Internship (medicine), training for a physician who has completed medical school
 Intern (computer science), an immutable copy of a string

Film and television
 The Interns (film), a 1962 drama film starring Michael Callan and Cliff Robertson
 The New Interns, the 1964 sequel film, starring Michael Callan and Dean Jones
 The Interns (TV series), a 1970 American drama series, spin-off of the 1960s films, starring Broderick Crawford
 The Intern (2000 film) about the world of fashion magazines, starring Dominique Swain, Joan Rivers, Peggy Lipton, and Kathy Griffin
 Scrubs: Interns, a 2009 webisode series, based upon and airing the same day as their eight season Scrubs episodes 
 Interns (TV series), or Интерны (Interny), a 2010–2016 Russian television medical sitcom
 The Internship, 2013 film, starring Vince Vaughn and Owen Wilson as recently-laid-off salesmen
 The Intern (2015 film), starring  Robert De Niro, Anne Hathaway, and Rene Russo

Music
 The Interns (band), a British rock group
 The Viceroys, Jamaican vocal group also known as The Interns

See also
 Internment